The Potter and the Clay is a 1914 American silent short film directed by George Melford.

Plot

Cast 
 Douglas Gerrard as Bertram Trent – a Man of Wealth
 Ollie Kirkby as Elsie Trent, Bertram's Wife
 Cleo Ridgely as Dorothy Trent, the Daughter
 Marin Sais as Rose Masters
 Elsie Maison as Lillian Masters, Rose's Daughter
 Thomas G. Lingham as Gates, a Gambler
 Jane Wolfe

Production
The film was produced by Kalem Company.

Release
The film was distributed by General Film Company, and was released in American cinemas on September 21, 1914.

References

External links
 

1914 films
American silent short films
1914 drama films
Silent American drama films
American black-and-white films
Films directed by George Melford
1910s American films